Mauricio Araújo de Sousa (born October 27, 1935) is a Brazilian cartoonist and businessman who has created over 200 characters for his popular series of children's comic books named "Turma da Mônica" or "Monica's Gang (Currently known as: Monica and friends)".

At 17 years of age, he worked for a daily newspaper called Folha da Manhã as a crime reporter. In 1959, Sousa quit that job and began his comic book career, and created Monica's Gang. Sousa's characters were inspired by children he knew from his childhood and by his own children. His later style is slightly reminiscent of that of Osamu Tezuka, a famous Japanese manga artist and personal friend.

Nowadays, he considered by many to be the greatest cartoonist in Brazilian history.

Biography
Mauricio Araújo de Sousa was born in Santa Isabel on October 27, 1935. His father, Antonio Mauricio de Sousa, was a poet and his mother, Petronilha Araújo de Sousa, also delved into poetry. Mauricio developed an interest in cartooning at a young age, and began to draw posters and illustrations for periodicals. At 17 years of age, he worked for a daily newspaper called Folha da Manhã as a crime reporter. In 1959, Sousa quit that job and began his comic book career, and created Monica's Gang.

The comics of Mauricio de Sousa have gained international fame, been featured on licensed merchandise, and have even been adapted for movies, television, video games, and even a São Paulo amusement park, the Parque da Mônica ("Monica's Park"). Two other Parque da Mônica facilities were also located in Curitiba and Rio de Janeiro, but they both closed in 2000 and 2005, respectively. From 1970 to 1986, Mauricio's comic books had been published by Editora Abril, until Globo took over in January 1987. His work has been published in many magazines and newspapers since 1959. Since January 2007, the comic book series is published by Panini Comics.

In 1997, the cartoonist founded the Mauricio de Sousa Cultural Institute, whose mandate is to develop social action campaigns that translate serious subjects into a comic book format to appeal to both young and adult readers.

Mauricio started publishing Turma da Mônica Jovem ("Monica Teen") in 2008, an offshoot series from "Monica's Gang", featuring Monica and her friends now as teenagers, adopting black-and-white pages, as well as art style heavily influenced from manga. Issue No. 34 of the "Monica Teen" comic book, presenting the first real kiss between Monica and Jimmy (they had already kissed in two previous occasions, but in a different context) had 500,000 sales.

In 2012, Mauricio published a two-issue story arc in the Monica Teen comic book featuring some of Osamu Tezuka's main characters, such as Astro, Sapphire and Kimba, joining Monica and her friends in an adventure in the Amazon rainforest against a smuggling organization chopping down hundreds of trees in the jungles of the Amazon. This is the first time that Tezuka Productions has allowed overseas animators to use Tezuka's characters. Rock Holmes, another character created by Tezuka, has featured as a villain in the story arc.

Awards
Mauricio's public service work has earned him international recognition. Among the honors he has received are the Brazilian presidential medal of honor for his promotion of human rights; an honorary doctorate in public service from La Roche College of Pittsburgh, Pennsylvania; and a Lifetime Achievement Award from the Brazilian International Press Association. In 2011, he was honored in the seventh edition of the Festival Internacional de Quadrinhos, at Belo Horizonte.

Personal life
Mauricio is the father of ten children, and drew inspiration from them for new characters such as Monica, Maggy, Marina, Mary Angela. Nimbus and Nick Nope. One of his sons, Maurício Spada e Sousa, died of a heart attack on May 2, 2016.

Artistic work
Some of Mauricio's creations include:

Monica and Friends – Mauricio's long-running signature series. Originally based on his childhood in Mogi das Cruzes and later adapting his children to be protagonists of the comics.
Monica Teen – Offshoot series from Monica's Gang, featuring Monica and her friends as teenagers in a manga-style publication. First published in 2008.
Blu – Anthropomorphized domestic animals (dogs, cats, etc.). Blu regularly exchanged dialogue with the "Tracer" of the comic.
Chuck Billy 'n' Folks – A farmer boy and his friends who live in a rural village in a city in the interior of Brazil. In 2013 it also had an offshoot series serving as an extension for Monica Teen.
Tina's Pals – A series about a group of teenage friends, aimed at the adolescent audience.
Bug-a-Booo – Comic horror stories featuring a ghost (the title character, called Penadinho in the original version), a vampire, a werewolf, a mummy, and a grim reaper (Dona Morte – Lady MacDeath in the English version), all of whom lived in a cemetery.
Lionel's Kingdom – Group of wild animals (both African and Brazilian) who lived under the reign of a lion king.
The Cavern Clan – Starring a smart and unmarried caveman named Pitheco and his friends from the Lem village, living with dinosaurs.
Horacio's World – An orphaned and ethical dinosaur; a tyrannosaurus who happened to be a vegetarian and also has his own gang, like most of Sousa's creations. First published in 1963.
The Tribe – a Native Brazilian child (Curumim in Tupi language) and his friends, who live in an Amazonian taba (village).
Bubbly the Astronaut – A Brazilian space adventurer who pilotes a round ship (called "Astronauta" in the original version). First published in 1963.
Nicodemon – A sarcastic and evil boy, one of few main characters in Mauricio's comics to have a negative personality. Debuted in 1966.
Pelézinho – A tribute to Pelé that centered around young Pelézinho ("Little Pelé") and his football playing friends. Published between 70s and 1986. Other similar versions inspired by other Brazilian soccer players like Ronaldinho Gaucho and Neymar Jr. have also been published by de Sousa in 2006 and 2013 respectively. Only Ronaldinho Gaucho was syndicated (by Atlantic Syndication) worldwide.

Notes

References

External links
  Mauricio de Sousa's website 
  Ronaldinho Gaucho summary and sample strips

1935 births
Brazilian comics artists
Living people
Brazilian people of Portuguese descent
Brazilian journalists
People from Santa Isabel, São Paulo
Monica's Gang
Brazilian animators
Brazilian comics writers
Brazilian cartoonists
Osamu Tezuka
Prêmio Angelo Agostini winners